Weymouth County, Queensland is one of the 318 Counties of Queensland Australia. The County is centered on Weymouth Bay, Cape York Peninsula within the Cook Land  District.  The county is divided into civil  parishes.

References 

Counties of Queensland